Luqu County is a county of the Gannan Tibetan Autonomous Prefecture in the south of Gansu province, China, bordering the provinces of Sichuan to the southeast and Qinghai to the west. Its postal code is 717200, and in 1999 its population was 30,039 people.

Kirti Namgyel Dechen Ling (Ganden Shedrub Pekar Drolwailing), a Gelug monastery located in Langmusi, was founded in 1748. It became the seat of the Kirti incarnation line.

Administrative divisions
Luqu County (碌曲县) is divided to 5 towns and 2 townships.
Towns

Townships
 Larenguan Township
 Ala Township

Climate

Transport
China National Highway 213

See also
 List of administrative divisions of Gansu

References

Luqu County
Gannan Tibetan Autonomous Prefecture